Laura Foster may refer to:

 Laura E. Foster, (1871-1920), American illustrator and cartoonist
 Laura Foster, murder victim of Tom Dula
 Laura Foster, fictional character in Simon and Laura